The Gula'ala language is spoken just off Malaita Island in the Solomon Islands.

References

Malaita languages
Languages of the Solomon Islands